Karlheinz Smieszek (born 5 August 1948 in Kitzingen, Bavaria) is a sport shooter and Olympic champion for West Germany. He won a gold medal in the 50 metre rifle prone event at the 1976 Summer Olympics in Montreal.

References

1948 births
Living people
People from Kitzingen
Sportspeople from Lower Franconia
German male sport shooters
ISSF rifle shooters
Olympic shooters of West Germany
Olympic gold medalists for West Germany
Shooters at the 1976 Summer Olympics
Olympic medalists in shooting

Medalists at the 1976 Summer Olympics